Matthew Louis D’Orazio (born October 1, 1976) is a former American football quarterback who played in the Arena Football League (AFL). He played college football at Otterbein College.

D'Orazio was a member of the Roanoke Steam, Rochester Brigade, Buffalo/Columbus Destroyers, Mohegan Wolves, Chicago Rush, Philadelphia Soul and Calgary Stampeders. He was named the MVP of ArenaBowl XX. He was also named the 2008 AFL MVP, as well as the ArenaBowl XXII MVP, both in the same season.

Early years
D'Orazio attended St. Francis DeSales High School in Columbus, Ohio, and lettered in football and basketball. In football, he was an All-State selection, and in basketball, he was an All-Conference selection. His #10 jersey was retired by the school.

College career
D'Orazio originally attended Youngstown State University where he red-shirted in 1995 and played in one game in 1996. He then transferred to Otterbein College, where he then set school single-season and career records for passing yards, touchdown passes and total offense. While there, he passed for 8,770 yards and 73 touchdowns while rushing for 594 yards and five touchdowns during his career. In 2012, D'Orazio was inducted into the Otterbein Athletic Hall of Fame.

Professional career

Milwaukee Mustangs
D'Orazio entered the Arena Football League in 2000, when he signed with the Milwaukee Mustangs, where he only spent one season. He was placed on recallable waivers by the Mustangs on January 25, 2001.

New Jersey Gladiators
Then on March 8, 2001, he signed with the New Jersey Gladiators. He was placed on recallable waivers by the Gladiators on April 9, 2001.

Roanoke Steam
In 2001, D'Orazio played for the Roanoke Steam of the AFL's minor league af2.

Rochester Brigade
In 2002, D'Orazio signed with the Rochester Brigade of the af2. For the season, he went 324-of-522, for 3,372 passing yards, 51 touchdowns, and 13 interceptions. He also rushed for 332 yards and 20 touchdowns, an af2 alltime record.

Buffalo Destroyers
In 2003, D'Orazio returned to the AFL, signing with the Buffalo Destroyers' practice squad on February 19, 2003. He was released by the Destroyers on April 9, 2003.

Mohegan Wolves
D'Orazio played for the Mohegan Wolves of the af2 in 2003.

Columbus Destroyers
He signed with the Columbus Destroyers on November 18, 2003, and played for the team until 2005.

Chicago Rush
On November 3, 2005, he signed a two-year contract with the Chicago Rush. At the end of the 2006 season, he led the league as the top-rated passer (126.2), and the top rusher with 200 yards and 10 touchdowns. In ArenaBowl XX, he threw for 250 yards and six touchdowns, as well as rushing for two. He was named Offensive Player of the Game and game MVP for his performance. In the off-season following the 2007 season, D'Orazio was released by the Rush on November 7, 2007. The team did not want to wait until January to make a call on whether to keep him following his 2007 back injury during the playoffs. He was replaced by former Arizona Rattlers quarterback Sherdrick Bonner.

Philadelphia Soul
In 2008, D'Orazio later signed with the Philadelphia Soul as a backup to Tony Graziani. He became the starting quarterback when Graziani was injured and was out for the season. D'Orazio was voted the AFL MVP for the season while leading Philadelphia to ArenaBowl XXII, where they defeated the San Jose SaberCats 59-56, and was named MVP of the game, as well. Along with George LaFrance, he is one of only two players to be named MVP of the ArenaBowl while playing for two different teams.

Calgary Stampeders
On February 13, 2009, the Calgary Stampeders of the Canadian Football League signed D'Orazio. He was released on June 25, 2009.

AFL statistics

Stats from ArenaFan:

References

External links
 Calgary Stampeders bio

1976 births
Living people
People from Elyria, Ohio
Players of American football from Ohio
American football quarterbacks
Canadian football quarterbacks
American players of Canadian football
Otterbein Cardinals football players
Milwaukee Mustangs (1994–2001) players
New Jersey Gladiators players
Buffalo Destroyers players
Manchester Wolves players
Columbus Destroyers players
Chicago Rush players
Philadelphia Soul players
Calgary Stampeders players
Roanoke Steam players
Rochester Brigade players
Sportspeople from Greater Cleveland